Karlie Redd (née Lewis; born April 15) born Keisha Lewis, is an American television personality, rapper, model and actress. She rose to prominence for appearing as a main cast member of VH1's reality show Love & Hip Hop: Atlanta since its premiere in June 2012.

Early life and education
Karlie (sometimes reported as "Keisha") Lewis was born in New York City to a Trinidadian mother and African-American father. Redd's birthday is April 15, but her  year of  birth is disputed. Redd spent her childhood between Trinidad and New York until returning to New York permanently at age 12. For education, Redd attended The Harlem School of the Arts and Alvin Ailey American Dance Theater. Redd is a college graduate.

Career
In 2001, Redd was cast in the movie Black Spring Break 2 where she was credited as Keisha "Karlie" Lewis. In 2010, Redd was in the VH1 reality show Scream Queens. In 2012 she was cast in the spin-off VH1 reality show, Love & Hip Hop: Atlanta. Redd has dated hip hop artists Benzino and Yung Joc on the show. According to an analysis done by a language analytics company, Redd's appearances on the fifth season of the show garnered 16% of all emotional reactions about the show collected from social media data, with the largest share of them being negative.

Redd's first role in a box office film was in the Chris Rock movie Top Five in 2014. She currently plays a recurring role on the soap opera Saints and Sinners, which appears on Bounce TV.

In July 2012, Redd released her debut single, "A Girl Has Needs", on iTunes. In October 2018, she announced an upcoming musical project called "Karlie Ferrari" which may be released as an EP.

Business ventures
In the summer of 2012, Redd launched the Redd Remy Hairline. She opened a women's clothing store called Merci Boutique in 2015 in Atlanta, Georgia.

Personal life
She has a daughter named Jasmine who has appeared on Love & Hip Hop: Atlanta.

Redd announced her engagement in October 2018.

Redd's birthday is April 15, and her birth year is estimated to be between 1969 and 1978. In 2012, Redd stated that she was "in her twenties" but would not reveal her birth year. Her age has been disputed by Love & Hip Hop: Atlanta co-star K. Michelle and Redd's ex-boyfriend and fellow co-star Benzino, Yung Joc, Scrapp DeLeon, Lyfe Jennings and Ceaser from Black Ink Crew, who have said she is older than she claims. Redd has an adult daughter, Jasmine, who was in college in 2015 and has appeared on Love & Hip Hop: Atlanta. In a 2015 Playboy Plus spread, Redd listed her age as 37, putting her birth year at 1978. On May 20, 2019, in an interview with The Real, Redd stated her age to be 45.

Filmography

Films

Television

References

External links
 
 

American hip hop musicians
American female dancers
Living people
Actresses from New York City
Dancers from New York (state)
Musicians from New York City
Participants in American reality television series
21st-century American actresses
21st-century American musicians
21st-century American women musicians
1968 births